Sigurðsson is a surname of Icelandic origin, meaning son of Sigurður. In Icelandic names, the name is not strictly a surname, but a patronymic.

Sigurðsson may refer to:

Arnar Sigurðsson (b. 1981), Icelandic professional tennis player
Baldur Sigurðsson (b. 1985), Icelandic professional football player
Birgir Sigurðsson (handballer) (b. 1965), Icelandic handball player 
Birgir Sigurðsson (writer) (b. 1937), Icelandic journalist and poet
Dagur Sigurðsson (b. 1973), Icelandic professional handball player and coach
Gylfi Sigurðsson (b. 1989), Icelandic professional football player
Hannes Sigurðsson (b. 1983), Icelandic professional football player 
Haraldur Sigurðsson (b. 1939), Icelandic volcanologist and geologist
Helgi Sigurðsson (b. 1974), Icelandic professional football player
Hreiðar Már Sigurðsson (b. 1970), Icelandic businessman and bank manager
Indriði Sigurðsson (b. 1981), Icelandic professional football player
Jón Sigurðsson (1811–1879), leader of the Icelandic independence movement; his face is on the 500 kronur note
Jónas Sigurðsson, Icelandic singer
Kristján Örn Sigurðsson (b. 1980), Icelandic professional football player
Lárus Sigurðsson (b. 1973), Icelandic professional football player
Ólafur Jóhann Sigurðsson (1918–1988), Icelandic author and poet
Ragnar Sigurðsson (b. 1986), Icelandic professional football player
Robbie Sigurðsson (b. 1993), Icelandic ice hockey player
Sigfús Sigurðsson (1922–1999), Olympic shot putter from Iceland
Sigfús Sigurðsson (born 1975), Olympic handball player from Iceland, grandson of the above
Sveinn Rúnar Sigurðsson (b. 1976), Icelandic pianist
Þráinn Sigurðsson (1912–2004), Icelandic chess player
Valgeir Sigurðsson (b. 1971), Icelandic record producer and composer

See also
Sigurðardóttir
Sigurðarson

References

Surnames
Icelandic-language surnames